Matthew Gibney (1 November 1835 in Killeshandra, Cavan, Ireland – 22 June 1925 in Perth, Western Australia), an Australian metropolitan bishop, was the third Roman Catholic Bishop of Perth, serving from 1886 until 1910.

Gibney gave Australian bushranger Ned Kelly his last rites following a shoot out at Glenrowan, Victoria in 1880.

Early years

He was raised on the family farm in Killygorman townland, parish of Kildallan, County Cavan. Gibney studied for the priesthood at the preparatory seminary at Stillorgan and from 1857 at the Catholic Missionary College of All Hallows, Drumcondra, Dublin. He was ordained priest in 1863 and arrived in Perth, Western Australia later that year.

On a trip to the colonies on the east coast of Australia, Gibney was travelling by train between Benalla and Albury when at Glenrowan, he heard of the Siege of Glenrowan and left the train. Gibney tended to the injured Ned Kelly, heard his confession and gave him the last rites.

Bishop of Perth
In January 1887, Gibney was consecrated as the Bishop of Perth. His episcopate was marked by a number of poor investment decisions as the diocese purchased shops, offices, houses and a hotel in Perth as well as a newspaper, exerting editorial influence by banning the publication of horse racing information; leading to the paper's eventual demise. As the diocese's debts mounted, Gibney was forced to resign in May 1910. During his episcopate he was closely involved with the founding of the Beagle Bay Aboriginal community north of Broome, along with what eventually became St John of God Health Care.

Gibney died of cancer on 22 June 1925 and was buried in St Mary's Cathedral.

Exhumation 
During restoration work in the cathedral from 2003 to 2006, the brick and plaster crypt containing the coffins of Gibney and Bishop Martin Griver were discovered by archaeologists under the floorboards of the cathedral.

References

 Appointment of the Very Rev. Matthew Gibney, Vicar General of the Catholic Diocese of Perth, Western Mail, 25 Sept. 1886, p. 11

Further reading

Matthew Gibney (1837–1925) bishop of Perth by Rev. Kilian P. Mitchell, in Breifne Journal, No. 16 (1973–1975), pp. 562–579.
Matthew Gibney (1837–1925) Bishop of Perth by Rev. Kilian Mitchell, in Breifne Journal, No. 37 (2001), pp. 402–405.
The many missions of Matthew Gibney (part I) by Joan Frances Carney, in Breifne Journal, No. 37 (2001), pp. 405–435. 
The many missions of Matthew Gibney (part II) by Joan Frances Carney, in Breifne Journal, No. 38 (2002), pp. 537–567.

1835 births
1925 deaths
People from County Cavan
Aquinas College, Perth
Christian Brothers College, Perth
Alumni of All Hallows College, Dublin
People from Perth, Western Australia
Roman Catholic bishops of Perth
19th-century Roman Catholic bishops in Australia
20th-century Roman Catholic bishops in Australia
Deaths from cancer in Western Australia
Irish emigrants to colonial Australia
19th-century Irish Roman Catholic priests